Pali Blues was an American women's soccer team, which played from 2008 to 2014. The team was a member of the United Soccer Leagues USL W-League, the second tier of women's soccer in the United States and Canada. The team played in the Western Conference against Colorado Force, Colorado Rush, LA Strikers, Santa Clarita Blue Heat, Seattle Sounders Women, Vancouver Whitecaps FC and Victoria Highlanders Women.

The team played its home games in the "Stadium-by-the-Sea" at Palisades High School in the Pacific Palisades area of Los Angeles, California. The club's colors were pale blue, orange and white and was a sister club to the Los Angeles Blues of the USL Pro league.

The club enjoyed robust fan support from the Tony Danza Army, their official supporters group.  The "Stadium By The Sea" was widely considered one of the toughest places to play in the W-League, confirmed by Blues manager Charlie Naimo, who called the Tony Danza Army's support the best he has seen in the United Soccer Leagues.

The Blues won their first W-League title in their debut season, beating FC Indiana 2–1 in the W-League Championship game in Virginia Beach, Virginia on August 2, 2008. They would repeat as champions by defeating the Washington Freedom Reserves 2–1 in Germantown, Maryland on August 7, 2009.

Before winning their first W-League title in August, the Pali Blues won the Las Vegas Silver Mug Tournament over Ajax America Women with one goal on February 10, 2008. Their first official game as a team was the first game of the Silver Mug tournament against Ajax America Women on February 9, 2008. The Blues scored a winning goal and moved on to defeat the Athleticos 8-0, the Legacy 9-0 and the Denver Diamonds 4-2. In the Semifinal round the Blues defeated the West Coast Soccer Club with one goal. 

In November 2014, the Blues announced that they would no longer compete in the W-League so the owners could focus their efforts on their USL franchise.

Players

Final 2014 roster 
Current at end of 2014.

Coaching staff
 Head Coach: Charlie Naimo
 Assistant Coach: Tracey Kevins
 Goalkeeper Coach: Brett Borm

Notable former players
The following former Blues have played at the professional and/or international level:

  Danesha Adams
  Sasha Andrews
  Karen Bardsley
  Liz Bogus
  Janice Cayman
  Leanne Champ
  Lauren Cheney
  Carrie Dew
  Whitney Engen
  Kendall Fletcher
  Lauren Fowlkes
  Mele French
  Sara Gama
  Ashlyn Harris
  Tobin Heath
  Valerie Henderson
  Tuija Hyyrynen
  Brittany Klein
  Kara Lang
  Amy LePeilbet
  Camille Levin
  Manya Makoski
  Collette McCallum
  Iris Mora
  Alex Morgan
  Kate Munoz
  Jill Oakes
  Kelley O'Hara
  Cathrine Paaske-Sørensen
  Ilaria Pasqui
  Erika Prado
  Christen Press
  Ali Riley
  Julie Rydahl Bukh
  Chanté Sandiford
  Rosie Tantillo
  Jodie Taylor
  India Trotter
  Aricca Vitanza
  Sarah Walsh
  Nikki Washington
  Michelle Wenino
  Kandace Wilson
  Kirsty Yallop

2008 roster, 2009 roster, 2010 roster, 2011 roster, 2012 roster 2013 roster, 2014 roster

Year-by-year

Honors
 USL W-League Champions 2008, 2009, 2013, 2014
 USL W-League Regular Season Champions 2008, 2012, 2014
 USL W-League Western Conference Champions 2008, 2009, 2012, 2013, 2014
 Las Vegas Silver Mug Tournament Champions 2008

References

External links
 Official site
 Official parent club site
  Pali Blues on USL Soccer

Women's soccer clubs in California
Soccer clubs in Los Angeles
USL W-League (1995–2015) teams
2008 establishments in California
Iranian soccer clubs in the United States
Pacific Palisades, Los Angeles